The Silver Condor Award for Best Adapted Screenplay , given by the Argentine Film Critics Association, awards the best adapted screenplay in film in Argentina each year:

 
Argentine Film Critics Association